Mabel's Stormy Love Affair is a 1914 film directed by and starring Mabel Normand, and produced by Mack Sennett.

Cast
Mabel Normand
Hank McCoy

External links

 
Madcap Mabel: Mabel Normand Website
Looking-for-Mabel
Mabel Normand Home Page

American silent short films
1914 films
Silent American comedy films
1914 comedy films
1914 short films
American black-and-white films
American comedy short films
1910s English-language films
Films directed by Mabel Normand
1910s American films